In mathematics, an unfolding of a smooth real-valued function ƒ on a smooth manifold, is a certain family of functions that includes ƒ.

Definition 

Let  be a smooth manifold and consider a smooth mapping  Let us assume that for given  and  we have .

Example 

Let  be given by  An example of an unfolding of  would be  given by 

Well-behaved unfoldings 

In practice we require that the unfoldings have certain properties. One property that we can impose is that 

where "" denotes "transverse to". This property ensures that as we vary the unfolding parameters we can predict – by knowing how the orbit foliates  – how the resulting functions will vary.

Versal unfoldings 

There is an idea of a versal unfolding. Every versal unfolding has the property that 
, but the converse is false.

.

The minimum number of unfolding parameters for a versal unfolding is equal to the Milnor number; that is not to say that every unfolding with that many parameters will be versal. Consider the function . A calculation shows that

This means that  give a basis for a versal unfolding, and that 

is a versal unfolding. A versal unfolding with the minimum possible number of unfolding parameters is called a miniversal unfolding.

Bifurcations sets of unfoldings 

An important object associated to an unfolding is its bifurcation set. This set lives in the parameter space of the unfolding, and gives all parameter values for which the resulting function has degenerate singularities.

Other terminology 

Sometimes unfoldings are called deformations, versal unfoldings are called versal deformations, etc.

References 
 V. I. Arnold, S. M. Gussein-Zade & A. N. Varchenko, Singularities of differentiable maps, Volume 1, Birkhäuser, (1985).
 J. W. Bruce &  P. J. Giblin, Curves & singularities, second edition, Cambridge University press, (1992).

Functions and mappings
Singularity theory